Events from the year 1993 in Kuwait.

Incumbents
Emir: Jaber Al-Ahmad Al-Jaber Al-Sabah
Prime Minister: Saad Al-Salim Al-Sabah

Events

Births

 13 February - Abdul Rahman Al Shammari.
 24 July - Talal Al-Rashidi.
 27 October - Yaqoub Al Taher.

See also
Years in Jordan
Years in Syria

References

 
Kuwait
Kuwait
Years of the 20th century in Kuwait
1990s in Kuwait